Windsor was a township (1751–1797) in early Middlesex County, in an area that is now within Mercer County, New Jersey, United States.

Windsor Township was formed by Royal Charter on March 9, 1751, from portions of Piscataway Township. Both East Windsor Township and West Windsor Township were formed when Windsor Township was divided on February 9, 1797. The township was named after Windsor, England.

References

Former townships in New Jersey
Geography of Mercer County, New Jersey